Thaon is a commune in the Calvados department in northwestern France. Thaon may also refer to
Colomby-sur-Thaon, a former commune in the Calvados department in France
Thaon-les-Vosges, a former commune in the Vosges department in France
ES Thaon, a French football club based in Thaon-les-Vosges
Thaon (surname)